The 2014 Citi Open women's singles was tennis tournament played on outdoor hard courts in Washington, D.C. Magdaléna Rybáriková was the two-time defending champion, but lost to Ekaterina Makarova in the first round.

Svetlana Kuznetsova won the title, defeating Kurumi Nara in the final, 6–3, 4–6, 6–4.

Seeds

Draw

Finals

Top half

Bottom half

Qualifying

Seeds

Qualifiers

Draw

First qualifier

Second qualifier

Third qualifier

Fourth qualifier

References
General

Main Draw
Qualifying Draw

Specific

Citi Open - Women's Singles